Bogs is a given name and surname.  Nooable people and fictional characters with the name include:

People
Bogs Adornado (born 1951), Filipino professional basketball player
Jürgen Bogs (born 1947), German football coach
Steffen Bogs (born 1965), German rower
Tom Bogs (born 1944), Danish middleweight boxer

Fictional characters
 Bogs Diamond, inmate character in the film ''The Shawshank Redemption

See also
Boggs (surname)